The TCG Alemdar (A-582) is an Alemdar-class submarine rescue mother ship (MOSHIP) of the Turkish Navy. Ordered on October 28, 2011 and built by Istanbul Shipyard, she was launched on April 29, 2014.

She is designed to perform subsea and surface search and rescue missions under various sea conditions. Her main task is to rescue submarines that can not resurface by their own efforts. She is equipped with remotely operated underwater vehicles (ROV) and atmospheric diving suits (ADS). A modern vessel with complex equipment on board, Alemdar will help maintain an appropriate level of salvage and recovery capability for the Turkish Navy's fleet of fourteen diesel-electric submarines.

See also 

 Underwater Search and Rescue Group Command (Turkey)

References

Ships built in Istanbul
2014 ships
Auxiliary ships of the Turkish Navy
Submarine rescue ships
Naval ships of Turkey